The First Legislative Assembly of Uttar Pradesh (a.k.a. First Vidhan Sabha of Uttar Pradesh) was constituted in May 1952 as a result of Indian general election, 1951–52. First Legislative Assembly had total of 431 MLAs (later revised to 426 including one nominated Anglo-Indian member).

Electors

Candidates

Important members

List of members
Default sort, in ascending order of constituency

See also

 Uttar Pradesh Legislative Assembly
 16th Vidhan Sabha of Uttar Pradesh
 Government of Uttar Pradesh
 History of Uttar Pradesh
 Politics of India

References 

Indian politics articles by importance
Uttar Pradesh Legislative Assembly